Lee Kwang-Seon (born September 6, 1989) is a South Korean football player who plays for Gyeongnam FC.

Club statistics

References

External links
 
 

1989 births
Living people
Association football defenders
South Korean footballers
South Korean expatriate footballers
J1 League players
J2 League players
Vissel Kobe players
Avispa Fukuoka players
Jeju United FC players
Gimcheon Sangmu FC players
Gyeongnam FC players
K League 1 players
Expatriate footballers in Japan
South Korean expatriate sportspeople in Japan